Lega Pro Prima Divisione was the third highest football league in Italy. It consisted of 33 teams, divided geographically into two divisions of 16 and 17 teams for group A and B respectively. Until 2008 it was known as Serie C1.

Before the 1978–79 season there were only three leagues of professional football in Italy, the third being Serie C. In 1978, it was decided to split Serie C into Serie C1 and Serie C2. Serie C2, the fourth highest professional league in the Italian system, was also renamed in 2008 and was called Lega Pro Seconda Divisione. 
The reform, already decided by the FIGC led to the reunification with the second division starting from 2014-2015 and with the subsequent rebirth of the third division championship organized by the pro league with 60 teams divided into three groups of 20 in Lega Pro.

Promotion and relegation
In each division, two teams were promoted to Serie B, and three teams were relegated to Lega Pro Seconda Divisione. In total, the league promoted 4 teams to Serie B and relegated 6 teams to Seconda Divisione.

The team finishing first in the regular season was directly promoted to Serie B, while teams placing 2nd to 5th were entered into a play-off semi-final for the chance of gaining the second promotional spot for that particular division.

Past champions
Source for league winners:

Serie C1

Group A

Group B

Lega Pro Prima Divisione

Group A

Group B

References

External links
Lega Pro current season tables, fixtures and results at Soccerway
Italian Clubs Divisional Movements 1929-1996 - RSSSF
Lega Pro Official Website 
Lega Pro at data sport.it 

 
1
Professional sports leagues in Italy
1978 establishments in Italy
Sports leagues established in 1978
2014 disestablishments in Italy
Sports leagues disestablished in 2014
Defunct football leagues in Italy
It